In category theory, a branch of mathematics, a fiber functor is a faithful k-linear tensor functor from a tensor category to the category of finite-dimensional k-vector spaces.

Definition 
A fiber functor (or fibre functor) is a loose concept which has multiple definitions depending on the formalism considered. One of the main initial motivations for fiber functors comes from Topos theory. Recall a topos is the category of sheaves over a site. If a site is just a single object, as with a point, then the topos of the point is equivalent to the category of sets, .

From covering spaces 
Consider the category of covering spaces over a topological space , denoted . Then, from a point  there is a fiber functorsending a covering space  to the fiber . This functor has automorphisms coming from  since the fundamental group acts on covering spaces on a topological space . In particular, it acts on the set .

With etale topologies 
There is algebraic analogue of covering spaces coming from the Étale topology on a connected scheme . The   underlying site consists of finite etale covers, which are finite flat surjective morphisms  such that the fiber over every geometryic point  is the spectrum of a finite etale -algebra. For a fixed geometric point , consider the geometric fiber  and let  be the underlying set of -points. In fact, it is a theorem of Grothendieck the automorphisms of  form a Profinite group, denoted , and induce a continuous group action on these finite fiber sets, giving an equivalence between covers and the finite sets with such actions.

From Tannakian categories 
Another class of fiber functors come from cohomological realizations of motives in algebraic geometry. For example, the De Rham cohomology functor  sends a motive  to its underlying de-Rham cohomology groups .

See also 

 Topos
 Étale topology
 Motive (algebraic geometry)
 Anabelian geometry

References

External links 

SGA 4 and SGA 4 IV
Motivic Galois group - https://web.archive.org/web/20200408142431/https://www.him.uni-bonn.de/fileadmin/him/Lecture_Notes/motivic_Galois_group.pdf

Category theory
Monoidal categories